Sámuel Mikoviny (? – 23 March 1750) was a mathematician, engineer, cartographer, and professor. He was a leading representative of science and technology in the 18th century Kingdom of Hungary and Habsburg monarchy.

Family
The family lived scattered throughout the territory of present-day Slovakia, some members have moved also other areas of the contemporary Kingdom of Hungary. His father, a poor lower nobleman Samuel Micovini, originated from the most numerous branch from Brezno (Breznóbánya). He worked in several Slovak villages, firstly as a teacher in Uhorské (Uhorszka) and Hradište (Hradistya), later he became an Evangelic priest in Turíčky (Turicska). In 1663, he moved to Ábelová (Ábelfalva). His mother was Helena Ničková (Nicsko, Niczko).

The date and the place of birth of his son polymath Sámuel is unknown. Mikoviny was possibly born in Turíčky (Turicska) or Ábelová (Ábelfalva), in 1686 or 1700. In 1727, he married Anna Regina Gillig from Svätý Jur (Szentgyörgy). The couple had five children, but only three survived - sons Karol Stanislav (geodest), Tomáš Ľudovít (engineer) and a daughter Alžbeta Kristína.

In the literature, Mikoviny is mentioned as a Slovak polymath (the first Slovak engineer) and also as a Hungarian.  The contemporary elites identified themselves as members of common Natio Hungarica regardless of their ethnic origin, whereas the contemporary term Hungarus is an umbrella term covering ethnic Hungarians (Magyars), Slovaks and other ethnic groups in the Kingdom of Hungary because the self-definition through a common homeland, class or religion was more common than through language. The Slovak origin of Mikoviny was noticed already by Ján Kollár and is supported by further research in present-day Slovakia. Besides another, the research in local archives confirmed that the father of Sámuel Mikoviny wrote his records in Turíčky (Turicska) in Slovak. Mikoviny declared himself in more of his maps and works as "nobilis Hungarus". Two letters written in Hungarian remained after him, however - as per the contemporary customs - by his studies and works mostly he used the German and the Latin language.

His name is written in contemporary sources and later literature in many forms - Mikoviny, Mikowiny, Mikovini, Mikovényi, Mickovini, Mikovinyi, Mikovínij, Mikowini, Mikovény. He used mostly the form Mikoviny and wrote his name without any diacritics.

Studies and work
He learnt engraving at Nuremberg, and studied mathematics at the nearby University of Altdorf and later in Jena. He probably took private lessons in astronomy and surveying in Vienna before he returned to Pressburg (Pozsony, present-day Bratislava).

In Nuremberg, Mikoviny showed that he was a good engraver and a gifted artist. His series of engravings, views of Altdorf and Nuremberg was published in a booklet of Altdorf in 1723. The publication also included a map of the district. His work was significantly influenced by another renowned scholar of the 18th century living in the multi-ethnic Kingdom of Hungary, Matthias Bel. Earlier Mikoviny engraved a map of Demänová Ice Cave and several illustrations for Bel's book Hungariae antiquae et novae prodromus (Messenger of Old and New Hungary), published in 1723 in Nuremberg.  After studies, he returned home to the Kingdom of Hungary.

From 1725, he was county engineer in Pressburg. He devoted most of his attention to improvement works, especially anti-flood works on the banks of the river Danube and Váh (Vág), work to secure their navigability, and regulation work near Tata. He also concerned himself with astronomy at an observatory which he had established at his home, probably the first at the territory of present-day Slovakia. His astronomical observations served map-making.

In 1731, Charles III delegated him to construct maps for Bel's great work, Notitia Hungariae Novae Historico-Geographica. Mikoviny then made a significant contribution to the making of a new map of the Kingdom of Hungary. He relied on his own measurements and used a scientific method, based on four basic principles: astronomical, geometrical, magnetic, and hydrographic. Mikoviny created the first topographical maps of individual counties of the Kingdom of Hungary. He also contributed to the work with illustrations, especially views of towns and castles. Mikoviny used his own prime meridian for the Kingdom of Hungary, the meridianus Posoniensis, which passed through the northeast tower of Bratislava Castle (Hungarian: Pozsonyi Vár, German: Pressburger Schloss).

In 1735, he became a main royal engineer of mining towns (now located in present-day Central Slovakia) and was instructed to found a mining school in Banská Štiavnica (Selmecbánya) which later became the (Mining Academy). Mikoviny became the director and the first professor. He lectured on mathematics, mechanics, hydraulics, and surveying methods and supervised practical work in land and mine surveying. From 1935, he was also a member of the Prussian Academy of Sciences in Berlin. He made a significant contribution to the development of mining in Lower Hungary (today in central Slovakia) helping it to achieve a place among the most technically developed industries in Europe at that time. He was a leading expert on the construction of water reservoirs, mining machinery, foundries, and mills. His chief contribution is a construction of a sophisticated system of reservoirs (tajchy), which drained water from the flooded mines in Banská Štiavnica (Selmecbánya) and provided energy for its local industry. He closely collaborated with Maximilian and Joseph Charles Hell.

He also worked as an engineer and builder of roads and bridges. During the Silesian Wars, Empress Maria Theresa of Austria employed him as a military engineer. He designed and built defensive and fortification works on the Moravian-Silesian frontier. In 1748, he carried out regulation work in the area of Komárom (today Komárom and Komárno), and at the time devoted attention to archaeological research. He studied and described the remains of the Roman fortress of Brigetio in Szőny, and made a plan of it. Various buildings were erected according to his plans. In 1749, he prepared plans for construction of a royal palace in Buda, and carried out preparation of the castle hill and construction of water treatment works for it. In 1750, he carried out anti-flooding works on the river Váh (Vág). During the works, he became ill and died on 23 March 1750 at a now unknown place on the road from Trenčín (Trencsén) to Banská Štiavnica (Selmecbánya). He is buried at an unknown location.

Legacy 
Mikoviny effectively resolved the energy supply for mining machines in the region of Banská Štiavnica (Selmecbánya) for the 18th, but also for the most of the 19th and the early 20th century. The artificial lake system significantly improved and extended by him is today part of UNESCO World Heritage Site. It is still in use and supplies the town with drinking water. Several Mikoniny's memorials were built in Slovakia and Hungary. A Samuel Mikovíni Prize has been presented in Slovakia since 2013, to recognize original developments resulting in significant improvements in science and technology.

References

References

Bibliography

External links
 Samuel Mikovini 
 Mikoviny Sámuel 
 Samuel Mikoviny, 1698-1750. Virtual exhibition

1698 births
1750 deaths
18th-century Hungarian mathematicians
Hungarian engineers
University of Altdorf alumni
University of Jena alumni
Hungarian expatriates in Germany